NHP2-like protein 1 is a protein that in humans is encoded by the SNU13 gene.

Function 

Originally named because of its sequence similarity to the Saccharomyces cerevisiae NHP2 (non-histone protein 2), this protein appears to be a highly conserved nuclear protein that is a component of the [U4/U6.U5] tri-snRNP. It binds to the 5' stem-loop of U4 snRNA. Two transcript variants encoding the same protein have been found for this gene.

Interactions 

SNU13 has been shown to interact with RAD17.

References

Further reading